Lockhartia lunifera is a species of orchid endemic to Brazil.

References

External links 

lunifera
Endemic orchids of Brazil